Ripak-e Shiran (also Romanized as Rīpak-e Shīrān; also known as Shīrān Bāzār) is a village in Negur Rural District, Dashtiari District, Chabahar County, Sistan and Baluchestan Province, Iran. At the 2006 census, its population was 216, in 41 families.

References 

Populated places in Chabahar County